Independente Futebol Clube, more commonly referred to as Independente de Limeira, is a Brazilian football club based in Limeira, São Paulo. The team compete in Campeonato Paulista Segunda Divisão, the fourth tier of the São Paulo state football league.

The club as known as Independente Futebol Sociedade Civil LTDA

History
Independente Futebol Clube was founded on January 19, 1944.

The supporters of Independente lived a historic day on Wednesday night. In the fifth round of the decisive quadrangular of the A3 Series, the modest team beat traditional rivals Inter de Limeira, champions of São Paulo in 86, 3-1 at Estádio Pradão and secured access to the A2 Series.

Achievements

 Campeonato Paulista Série A3:
 Winners (1): 1973
 Campeonato Paulista Série B:
 Winners (1): 1999
 Copa Energil C:
 Winners (1): 2007

Rival
Internacional de Limeira is the club's rival.

References

External links
 Fan site (inactive)

Association football clubs established in 1944
Football clubs in São Paulo (state)
1944 establishments in Brazil
Limeira